Velykyi Zholudsk is a village in Varash Raion, Rivne Oblast, Ukraine,but was formerly administered within Volodymyrets Raion. As of the year 2001, the community had 796 residents. Postal code — 34364. KOATUU code — 5620881501.

References

External links 
 Velykyi Zholudsk. Old maps

Volhynian Governorate

Villages in Varash Raion